Reschid Pasha may refer to:
Koca Mustafa Reşid Pasha
Reşid Mehmed Pasha